Guadalupe Canyon is a canyon and valley in the southern portion of the Peloncillo Mountains Hidalgo County, New Mexico, Cochise County, Arizona and Agua Prieta Municipality, of Sonora. The waters of Guadalupe Canyon are tributary to the San Bernardino River joining it at its mouth at  just below Dieciocho de Augusto, Sonora.

In 1864, the Mormon Battalion marched through Guadalupe Canyon. In 1881 the Guadalupe Canyon Massacre took place.

Habitat

The canyon is a wildlife corridor and provides habitat for violet-crowned hummingbirds and aplomado falcons. Other birds in the area are the broad-billed hummingbird, northern beardless tyrannulet, summer tanager, thick-billed kingbird, Elf Owl, black-tailed gnatcatcher, varied bunting, and wild turkey. The black-chinned hummingbird, and Costa's hummingbird also nest in the canyon.

Guadalupe canyon is also a wildlife corridor for Mexican gray wolves, and endangered jaguars, whose range bridges between the borders of both countries. Black bears, mountain lions, ocelots, and white-nosed coati also use the canyon as a corridor and hunting ground. The canyon area is a federally designated critical habitat for endangered wild feline.

Trees in the riparian habitat areas within the canyon include oak, Arizona sycamore, willow, and Freemont Cottonwood.

Hot springs
There are two hot spring zones in Guadalupe Canyon, Guadalupe Canyon Hot Springs and the Guadalupe Canyon Oasis. Primitive rock-lined soaking pools and waterfalls are found at both areas, however the latter is more developed and features a campground with flush toilets and hot showers. The hot mineral springs were used by Native Americans for centuries before the arrival of early settlers and itinerant animal herders. Thermal springs in the American Southwest were used for thousands of years, per archaeological evidence of human use and settlement by Paleo-Indians. There are numerous petroglyphs and ochre-pigmented rock art throughout the canyon.

Border barrier
In 2020, portions of the canyon's sides were dynamited to make way for the Trump wall, prompting heavy criticism. The gap is not large enough for mammals and certain reptiles, such as desert tortoises to pass through.

References

Landforms of Hidalgo County, New Mexico
Landforms of Cochise County, Arizona
Landforms of Sonora
Rivers of Sonora
Cooke's Wagon Road